ISK may mean:
 Icelandic króna, by ISO 4217 currency code
 Internationaler Sozialistischer Kampfbund, former German socialist party
 Interstellar Kredit in the gameplay of Eve Online
 International School of Kabul, Afghanistan
 International School of Kenya, Nairobi
 International School of Koje, South Korea
 International School of Kraków, Poland
 International School of Kuantan, Malaysia
 Islamic State of Iraq and the Levant – Khorasan Province, sometimes referred to as Islamic State Khorasan (ISK or IS-K)